Takahiro Ushiyama (born 1 May 1981) is a Japanese speed skater. He competed in four events at the 2006 Winter Olympics.

References

1981 births
Living people
Japanese male speed skaters
Olympic speed skaters of Japan
Speed skaters at the 2006 Winter Olympics
Sportspeople from Nagano Prefecture